GM C platform, also known as the C-Body, was a front wheel drive (FWD) automobile platform used by General Motors's Cadillac, Buick and Oldsobile divisions for their full-sized automobiles from 1985 through 1996, sharing a transverse engine configuration, rack and pinion steering and four-wheel independent suspension. 

Significantly shorter, narrower, lighter and more fuel-efficient than the platform they replaced, the C Platform vehicles were noted for having nearly the same key interior dimensions as their predecessors and a much more nearly flat passenger compartment floor — albeit with thinner seats and dramatically less upper tumblehome, locating windshield as well as side glass closer to passengers. 

Introduced in early 1984, the models were marketed as the Oldsmobile Ninety-Eight (11th gen), Buick Electra (6th gen) and Cadillac Deville (6th gen) and Fleetwood (1985-90), and were manufactured at Wentzville Assembly, Orion Assembly, and Lansing Car Assembly. 

All C-Bodies used, V6 or V8 engines, GM's TMH440 transaxle (initially), unibody construction — and all had been aerodynamically refined, with the Oldsmobile achieving a .383 drag coefficient. 

Both the H platform and C platform were largely identical, sharing the same 110.8 in wheelbase, most bodywork, interior details, glass and engines. 

Cadillac would later introduce C Body models with a 113.8 in wheelbase. Most C-body vehicles were ultimately replaced with cars on the related G, H, and K platform designations.

The Cadillac Series 75 limousine briefly made its return on this platform, stretched by 23.6" to a wheelbase of 134.4". Cadillac used the platform though 1993; Buick heavily revised the Electra, becoming the first generation Buick Park Avenue (1991-1996), while still using the C Platform; and Oldsmobile marketed C Platform derivatives through 1990, notably the Oldsmobile Touring Sedan.

Models using the C Platform

Related H body models
The H platform and C platform were largely identical, sharing the same 110.8 in wheelbase, most bodywork, interior details, glass and engines.

References 

List of GM VIN codes

C